RFA Sir Caradoc (L3522) was a temporarily chartered roll-on/roll-off ferry of the Royal Fleet Auxiliary. She was procured to fill the gap caused by loss and damage to Round Table class landing ships during the Falklands War.

Amphibious warfare vessels of the Royal Fleet Auxiliary
1972 ships